Ottosen is a city in Humboldt County, Iowa, United States. The population was 40 in the 2020 census, a decline from 61 in 2000.

History

Much of the town burned in a fire in the mid 20th century and was never rebuilt.

Geography

Demographics

2010 census
As of the census of 2010, there were 55 people, 23 households, and 17 families living in the city. The racial makeup of the city was 90.9% White and 9.1% from two or more races. Hispanic or Latino of any race were 3.6% of the population.

There were 23 households, of which 30.4% had children under the age of 18 living with them, 65.2% were married couples living together, 4.3% had a female householder with no husband present, 4.3% had a male householder with no wife present, and 26.1% were non-families. 26.1% of all households were made up of individuals, and 8.6% had someone living alone who was 65 years of age or older. The average household size was 2.39 and the average family size was 2.65.

The median age in the city was 44.8 years. 29.1% of residents were under the age of 18; 1.8% were between the ages of 18 and 24; 20.1% were from 25 to 44; 30.9% were from 45 to 64; and 18.2% were 65 years of age or older. The gender makeup of the city was 47.3% male and 52.7% female.

2000 census
As of the census of 2000, there were 61 people, 24 households, and 19 families living in the city. The racial makeup of the city was 100.00% White.

There were 24 households, out of which 41.7% had children under the age of 18 living with them, 58.3% were married couples living together, 12.5% had a female householder with no husband present, and 20.8% were non-families. 16.7% of all households were made up of individuals, and 16.7% had someone living alone who was 65 years of age or older. The average household size was 2.54 and the average family size was 2.89.

In the city, the population was spread out, with 31.1% under the age of 18, 3.3% from 18 to 24, 27.9% from 25 to 44, 27.9% from 45 to 64, and 9.8% who were 65 years of age or older. The median age was 38 years. For every 100 females, there were 117.9 males. For every 100 females age 18 and over, there were 110.0 males.

The median income for a household in the city was $34,000, and the median income for a family was $34,000. Males had a median income of $25,714 versus $25,000 for females. The per capita income for the city was $15,525. There were no families and 3.8% of the population living below the poverty line, including no under eighteens and 33.3% of those over 64.

Education
It is within the Twin Rivers Community School District.

References

External links

  
City-Data Comprehensive Statistical Data and more about Ottosen

Cities in Humboldt County, Iowa
Cities in Iowa
Populated places established in 1906
1906 establishments in Iowa